Lorenzo Porzio (born 24 August 1981, in Rome) is an Italian rower. He is also a world renown pianist and conductor.

References 
 
 

1981 births
Living people
Italian male rowers
Rowers from Rome
Rowers at the 2004 Summer Olympics
Olympic bronze medalists for Italy
Olympic rowers of Italy
Olympic medalists in rowing
Medalists at the 2004 Summer Olympics